is a Japanese voice actor. He is from Nagano, Japan. He is part of the talent agency KeKKe.

Notable voice roles

Anime
Bakkyuu HIT! Crash Bedaman (Mysterious old man)
Beast Wars II: Chō Seimeitai Transformers (Autostinger, Coelagon)
Eyeshield 21 ("Doc" Billy Horide)
Fullmetal Alchemist: Brotherhood (Giolio Comanche)
Ginga Densetsu Weed (Kurotora)
Hunter × Hunter (1999) (Zeno Zoldyck)
The iDOLM@STER (Uncle)
Immortal Grand Prix (Benjamin Bright)
JoJo's Bizarre Adventure (Dario Brando)
Koutetsu Sangokushi (Harishou Shifu)
Kujibiki♥Unbalance (Fernandez)
Pocket Monsters: Diamond and Pearl (Village headman)
PoPoLoCrois (Chinsan)
Pupipō! (Bakuzan-sensei)
Shura no Toki - Age of Chaos (Gohei, Sasuke)
Sisters of Wellber (Jamo)
Stitch! (Abekoobe's father)
Yakitate!! Japan (Master)
Yomigaeru Sora - Rescue Wings (Takanobu Tsunematsu)
Yu-Gi-Oh! Duel Monsters (Sugoroku Mutou, Siamun Muran)
Yu-Gi-Oh! Duel Monsters GX (Sugoroku Mutou)
Macross Frontier (Richard Bilrer)

OVAs
Azusa, Otetsudai Shimasu! (Drink shop owner)
Rockman: Irregular Hunter X (Dr. Cain)

Films
Beast Wars II: The Movie (Autostinger, Coelagon)
Yu-Gi-Oh! The Movie: Pyramid of Light (Sugoroku Mutou)
Yu-Gi-Oh! 3D: Bonds Beyond Time (Sugoroku Mutou)
Yo-kai Watch Shadowside: Oni-ō no Fukkatsu (Papa Bolt)

Video games
Hyrule Warriors (Wizzro)
Rockman X3 (Dr. Cain)
Sengoku Basara series (Hōjō Ujimasa)
Super Robot Wars series (Baran Doban, Magnaz Ald)
Xenoblade Chronicles (Miqol)

Drama CDs
Konoyo Ibun Series 3: Kitsune No Yomeiri (Kurayo)

Dubbing roles

Live-action
Harry Potter and the Deathly Hallows – Part 1 – Griphook (Warwick Davis)
Harry Potter and the Deathly Hallows – Part 2 – Griphook (Warwick Davis)
Journey 2: The Mysterious Island – Gabato Laguatan (Luis Guzmán)
Mary Poppins Returns – Mr. Binnacle (Jim Norton)

Animation
Barbie in the Nutcracker – Mouse King
Corpse Bride – Mayhew
The Cramp Twins – Tony Parsons
The Nuttiest Nutcracker – Reginald the Mouse King
Steven Universe – Uncle Grandpa
SWAT Kats: The Radical Squadron – Chance Furlong/T-Bone
Transformers – Starscream
Transformers: Revenge of the Fallen – Starscream
Transformers: Dark of the Moon –  Starscream
Uncle Grandpa – Uncle Grandpa

References

KeKKe

External links 
 

1955 births
Japanese male voice actors
Living people
People from Nagano (city)